The 2006–07 Scottish Cup was the 122nd edition of Scotland's most prestigious football knockout competition, also known for sponsorship reasons as the Tennent's Scottish Cup. The competition was won by Celtic after defeating Dunfermline Athletic in the final.

Dunfermline Athletic reached the final despite having been relegated from the Scottish Premier League. En route to the final they defeated 31 times winners of the competition Rangers, Cup holders Hearts, Partick Thistle and the 2007 League Cup winners Hibernian. This meant that Dunfermline faced the two biggest clubs from Edinburgh and the three biggest clubs from Glasgow, Scotland's largest cities.

Celtic's route to the final was somewhat more straightforward, defeating lower league sides Dumbarton and Livingston in the third and fourth rounds respectively. They did, however, require two late goals in their quarter-final match with Inverness CT to win the tie 2-1. They defeated First Division side St Johnstone in the Semi-final stage.

Highland League side Deveronvale reached the Fourth round for the first time in their history, eventually going out to First Division Partick Thistle.

This was to be the final season replays were played in the semi-finals.

Schedule

First round

Source: ESPN Soccernet

Replays

Source: ESPN Soccernet

Second round

Source: ESPN Soccernet

Third round

Replays

Fourth round

Quarter-finals

Semi-finals

Replay

Final

External links
 Official Tennent's Scottish Cup Website

Scottish Cup seasons
Scottish Cup, 2006-07
Scot